Barry Redden (born July 21, 1960) is a former American football running back who played for the Los Angeles Rams, the San Diego Chargers, and the Cleveland Browns of the National Football League (NFL). He played college football at the University of Richmond and was selected in the first round of the 1982 NFL Draft by the Rams, where he spent much of his career as a back-up to Pro Football Hall of Fame running back Eric Dickerson.

Redden is currently the president of the NFLPA Retired Players-Houston Chapter.

References

1960 births
Living people
American football running backs
Cleveland Browns players
Los Angeles Rams players
Richmond Spiders football players
San Diego Chargers players
Sportspeople from Sarasota, Florida
Players of American football from Florida